The Toy Soldiers is a 2014 American coming-of-age drama film was written and directed by Erik Peter Carlson, and starring Najarra Townsend, Constance Brenneman, Chandler Rylko, and Jeanette May Steiner.

Set in the 1980s, five coming-of-age stories unravel together on the final evening that local hangout, The Soldiers Roller Rink, closes its doors. During an ongoing night of sex, drugs, and rock "n" roll, the innocence of youth will unravel and each individuals life will be changed forever.

Background
Erik Peter Carlson's sophomore feature film portrays an unsentimentally realistic story about the life, complexities and savageries faced by teens and their families in the 1980s culture of America.  Many scenes from the film were shot at the Huntington Beach Pier and the Moonlight Rollerway in Glendale.

The film premiered on June 8, 2014 at the Dances With Films festival as the Closing Night Feature at the TCL Chinese Theatre. The film was theatrically released November 14, 2014 in AMC Theatres.

Plot
On one evening in a decade of sex, drugs, and rock 'n' roll, the innocence of youth and family unravels. Five parallel coming-of-age stories dramatize the stages of grief. A youthful mother in a custody battle over her children finds tranquility with the bottle. The abuse of her ex-husband still haunts the children; a nineteen-year-old drug addict, and his younger brother, a bullied closet homosexual. There's the story of the dog; a teen who offers sexual favors to gain acceptance, the challenged classmate who would do anything for her love, and the redhead beauty, haunted by a secret, tragic past. These lives and others will change forever on this final evening before their hangout, The Toy Soldiers Roller Rink, closes its doors for the final time.

Cast
Najarra Townsend as Angel
Constance Brenneman as Mary Harris
Chandler Rylko as Elliot Harris
Jeanette May Steiner as Layla
Samuel Nolan as Jack Harris
Nick Frangione as Steve 
Amelia Haberman as Sue Harris
Matt Harrelson as The Stud 
Megan Hensley as Cricket
Andre Myers as Wilson
 Kevin Pinassi as Clyde Harris
Thatcher Robinson as Jason
Izzy Pollak as Harold Beaver
Marco Tazioli as Freddie
Danno White as Sean
Kelsey Impicciche as Female skater

Screenings
The film premiered at Dances With Films on June 8, 2014, and on October 2, 2014, got its screening at the SoCal Independent Film Festival.

On October 18, 2014, the film got its screening at the Hollywood Film Festival.

On November 14, 2014, The Toy Soldiers was premiered on red carpet at the Universal CityWalk Hollywood.

Reception
On review aggregator website Rotten Tomatoes, the film has a 50% approval rating based on 6 reviews, with an average ranking of 7/10.

Dennis Harvey of Variety wrote "With its stilted monologues and crudely melodramatic air of "shocking realism," Erik Peter Carlson's sophomore feature feels like a series of interlocking fringe-theater one-acts that have only grown more artificial onscreen".

The Village Voices Sherilyn Connelly commented that "As compelling as an individual thread or scene might be, the picture as a whole lacks forward momentum, as is often the case with films with asynchronous timelines".

The Hollywood Reporter called the film "A not-so-convincing teenage wasteland".

According to Gary Goldstein of the Los Angeles Times the film have a "way overlong ensemble melodrama".

Lawrence Toppman of The Charlotte Observer was of a different opinion, his reaction was "The rough honesty hooks you, and overlapping storylines eventually sort themselves out".

Awards and nominations
The film received multiple nominations at its 2014 festival screening: 
'Industry Choice Award' and 'Audience Award for Best Feature Film' at Dances With Films
Nominated 'Best Emerging Filmmaker' for Erik Peter Carlson at Hollywood Film Festival
Nominations for 'Best Actor' for Samuel Nolan, 'Best Actress - Achievement in Acting' for Constance Brenneman, 'Best Cinematography - Feature Film' for Dan Witrock, and 'Best Screenplay' and 'Best Director - Feature Film', and 'SoCal IFF Award' for Erik Peter Carlson at the SoCal Independent Film Festival.

References

External links

Mance Media
Fan Page
PopTrigger Interview

American independent films
2010s teen drama films
American teen drama films
2014 drama films
2010s English-language films
2010s American films
2014 independent films